USS Marlin may refer to:

, a  launched 29 January 1941 and sold for scrapping 29 March 1946
, launched 14 October 1953 and donated for a museum ship in 1973, residing in Omaha, Nebraska

United States Navy ship names